Matteo Di Gennaro (born 2 June 1994) is an Italian professional footballer who plays as a defender for  club Feralpisalò on loan from Triestina.

Career

Ascoli
Born in Sant'Elpidio a Mare, Marche region, Di Gennaro started his career at Marche club Ascoli.

Parma
In June 2011, few days before the closure of 2010–11 financial year, Di Gennaro was swapped with young Parma defender Zsolt Tamási in a no cash involving co-ownership deals. Both 50% registration rights of the players were tagged for €1.7 million; Di Gennaro signed a 4-year contract. Di Gennaro was a player of the reserve team of Parma from 2011 until 2013. On 2 September 2013, the last day of transfer window, Parma sent Di Gennaro back to Ascoli as well as loaned goalkeeper Stefano Russo to the same team on the same day.

Di Gennaro made his professional debut in 2013–14 Lega Pro Prima Divisione on 6 October 2013, against Grosseto. He was the unused bench on round 3.

On 20 June 2014 Di Gennaro, Pasqualini and Gragnoli were acquired by Parma outright, with Colomba was also bought back by Parma, however Di Gennaro also signed by Ascoli Picchio in 2-year loan; on 1 July 2014 Tamási also returned to Parma; on 18 July 2014 Ascoli signed Bright Addae as well as released Storani on 29 July, whom joint-contracted with Parma.

Renate
On 22 July 2014 Di Gennaro was loaned to Renate. on 25 June 2015 Di Gennaro became a free agent, after the bankruptcy of Parma F.C. On 9 July he signed a new 3-year contract.

Livorno
In 2018 he signed for Livorno.

On 7 September 2020, he signed a 3-year contract with Reggiana. However, 13 days later, Reggiana renounced to buy him.

Alessandria
On 18 January 2021, he signed a 2.5-year contract with Alessandria.

Triestina
On 17 August 2022, Di Gennaro moved to Triestina on a two-year deal.

Feralpisalò
On 31 January 2023, Di Gennaro moved to Feralpisalò on loan with an obligation to buy.

References

Italian footballers
Ascoli Calcio 1898 F.C. players
Parma Calcio 1913 players
A.C. Renate players
U.S. Livorno 1915 players
U.S. Alessandria Calcio 1912 players
U.S. Triestina Calcio 1918 players
FeralpiSalò players
Serie B players
Serie C players
Association football defenders
Sportspeople from the Province of Fermo
1994 births
Living people
Footballers from Marche
People from Sant'Elpidio a Mare